County Leitrim is a county in Ireland. It is in the province of Connacht and is part of the Northern and Western Region. It is named after the village of Leitrim. Leitrim County Council is the local authority for the county, which had a population of 35,087 according to the 2022 census.

The county encompasses the historic Gaelic territory of West Breffny corresponding to the northern part of the county, and Muintir Eolais or Conmaicne Réin, corresponding to the southern part.

Geography

Leitrim is the 26th largest of the 32 counties by area  (the 21st largest of the 26 counties of the Republic) and the smallest by population. It is the smallest of Connacht's five counties in both size and population. Leitrim is bordered by the counties of Donegal to the north, Fermanagh to the north-east, Cavan to the east, Longford to the south, Roscommon to the south-west and Sligo to the west. Fermanagh is in Northern Ireland while all the other neighbouring counties are within the Republic of Ireland.

Leitrim has a hilly and mountainous landscape in its northwest and is relatively flat in the southeast, each separated from the other by Lough Allen in the middle of the county. Leitrim has the shortest length of coastline of any Irish county that touches the sea. The Shannon is linked to the Erne via the Shannon–Erne Waterway. Notable lakes include:
Lough Melvin 
Lough Allen
Lough Gill is to the northwest of Dromahair; Parke's Castle is located on the lakeshore.
Belhavel Lough is also located in Dromahair, within the parish of Killargue.
Lough Scur, and Saint John's Lough, on the Shannon–Erne Waterway.
Glencar Lough which lies mostly in Leitrim is fed via Glencar waterfall made famous in the poem The Stolen Child by William Butler Yeats.
Rockfield Lake, just east of Carrigallen in South Leitrim, is popular with anglers; while part of this lake is in County Leitrim, most of it is in County Cavan
Other lakes include Upper Lough MacNean, Glenade Lough, Garadice Lough, Rinn Lough, Lough Scannal, Lough Erril and Lough Machugh.

History
In ancient times Leitrim formed the western half of the Kingdom of Breifne. This region was long influenced by the O'Rourke family of Dromahair, whose heraldic lion occupies the official county shield to this day. Close ties initially existed with the O'Reilly clan in the eastern half of the kingdom, however, a split occurred in the 13th century and the kingdom was divided into East Breifne, now County Cavan, and West Breifne, now County Leitrim. The Normans invaded south Leitrim in the 13th century but were defeated at the Battle of Áth an Chip in 1270.

Much of the county was confiscated from its owners in 1620 and given to Villiers and Hamilton. Their initial objective was to plant the county with English settlers. However, this proved unsuccessful. English Deputy Sir John Perrot had ordered the legal establishment of "Leitrim County" a half-century prior, in 1565. Perrott also demarcated the current county borders around 1583.

Long ago Ireland was covered in woodland, and five great forests are traditionally said to have stood in Leitrim, with a 19th-century county survey stating- "a hundred years ago almost the whole country was one continued, undivided forest, so that from Drumshanbo to Drumkeeran, a distance of nine or ten miles, one could travel the whole way from tree to tree by branches". Many of these great forests were denuded for the making of charcoal for iron works around Sliabh an Iarainn.  Working of the county's rich deposits of iron ore began in the 15th century and continued until the mid-18th century. Coal mining became prominent in the 19th century to the east of Lough Allen at Sliabh an Iarainn and also to the west in Arigna, on the Roscommon border. The last coal mine closed in July 1990 and there is now a visitor centre. Sandstone was also quarried in the Glenfarne region.

Writing in 1791, the geographer Beaufort suggested the county housing population encompassed 10,026 homes with "upwards of 50,000 inhabitants", the primary agriculture being cattle production, and the growth of flax sustaining the linen industry. Leitrim was first hit by the recession caused by the mechanisation of linen weaving in the 1830s and its 155,000 residents (as of the 1841 census) were ravaged by the Great Famine and the population dropped to 112,000 by 1851. The population subsequently continued to decrease due to emigration. After many years, the wounds of such rapid population decline have finally started to heal. Agriculture improved over the last century. Leitrim now has the fastest growing population in Connacht.

The Book of Fenagh is the most famous medieval manuscript originating here. In the 19th century the poet John McDonald (of Dromod) lived in the county, and William Butler Yeats spent the turn of the twentieth century fascinated with Lough Allen and much of Leitrim. Glencar Waterfall,  from Manorhamilton, inspired Yeats and is mentioned in his poem The Stolen Child.

Subdivisions

Geographically, the county is almost evenly divided along north–south lines by Lough Allen, the River Shannon and Sliabh an Iarainn. Uniquely among Irish counties, there is no way to cross from the north of the county to the south (or vice versa) by road without leaving its boundaries. North Leitrim is slightly larger than the south, comprising 51% of County Leitrim's land area. However, South Leitrim, with towns such as Carrick-on-Shannon, Ballinamore and Drumshambo, is significantly more populous, containing approximately 65% of the county's population as of 2016.

Baronies
There are five historic baronies in the county. While baronies continue to be officially defined units, they are no longer used for many administrative purposes. Their official status is illustrated by Placenames Orders made since 2003, where official Irish names of baronies are listed under "Administrative units". They are Carrigallen, Drumahaire, Leitrim, Mohill and Rosclogher.

Rural districts
Under the Local Government (Ireland) Act 1898, County Leitrim was divided into the rural districts of Ballyshannon No. 3 (later renamed Kinlough), Bawnboy No. 2 (later renamed Ballinamore), Carrick-on-Shannon No. 1, Manorhamilton and Mohill. The rural districts were abolished in 1925.

Largest towns in County Leitrim
As of the 2016 census:
 Carrick-on-Shannon*, 4,062 (A small part of Carrick-on-Shannon is in County Roscommon)
 Manorhamilton, 1,466
 Kinlough, 1,032
 Ballinamore, 914
 Drumshanbo, 902
 Mohill, 855
 Dromahair, 808
 Leitrim, 594
 Roosky*, 564 (Most of Roosky is in County Roscommon)
 Dromod, 555

Demographics

Leitrim has the fastest-growing population of any county in Connacht. As measured by the census, the population rose by 36% between 2002 and 2022 to 35,087.
2005 HEA statistics identified that Leitrim has the highest rate of participation in higher education in Ireland with 75% of 17- to 19-year-olds being admitted to a higher course.
The county town is Carrick-on-Shannon (population 4,062). It is a highly developed, prospering river port on the River Shannon and many tourists hire cruising boats here to explore the Shannon and the Shannon–Erne Waterway, which is a 63 km canal linking the two river systems. It is amongst the fastest growing towns in Ireland and has grown by 25% in the past few years.

Local government and politics
Leitrim County Council is the local authority for the county. The county is divided into three local electoral areas, each of which is also a municipal district: Ballinamore (6 councillors), Carrick-on-Shannon (6 councillors), and Manorhamilton (6 councillors). Leitrim County Council has two representatives on the Northern and Western Regional Assembly.

2019 seats summary
The following were elected at the 2019 Leitrim County Council election:

National politics
Leitrim is part of the Dáil constituency of Sligo–Leitrim. This constituency existed from 1948 to 2007, and previously from 1923 to 1937 as Leitrim–Sligo. From 1937 to 1948, the county formed the Leitrim constituency. From 2007 until 2016, County Leitrim was divided between two constituencies: Roscommon–South Leitrim and Sligo–North Leitrim. This proved controversial, and at the 2007 general election there was no TD elected whose domicile was in the county. Sligo–Leitrim was recreated at the 2016 general election.

Transport

Supplementing the local and regional road networks are the N15 (Sligo-Leitrim-Donegal), N16 (Sligo-Leitrim-Enniskillen) and N4 (Sligo-Leitrim-Dublin) national roads.
Railway stations in Leitrim on the Dublin to Sligo line include Dromod and Carrick-on-Shannon.
The Cavan and Leitrim Railway opened on 17 October 1887. It consisted of two branches, meeting at Ballinamore which connected Dromod and Arigna with Belturbet. Services carried goods, passengers and coal from around Lough Allen. Although protested, the line finally closed on 31 March 1959. A revived heritage railway centre and transport museum with a running line has been based at Dromod since the 1990s.
Railway stations in Leitrim on the former Sligo, Leitrim and Northern Counties Railway (which ran between Sligo and Enniskillen) included Dromahair, Manorhamilton and Glenfarne.
The Shannon and Shannon–Erne Waterway give access to much of Leitrim by boat.

People

1400s
Charles Reynolds (1496-1535) – posthumously attainted of treason for convincing the Pope to excommunicate Henry VIII.

1600s
Turlough Carolan (1670-1738) – harpist

1700s
Robert Strawbridge (d.1781) -  American Methodist preacher born at Drumsna.

1800s
Margaret Haughery (1813–1882) – philanthropist, Margaret of New Orleans, known as "the mother of the orphans".
William Henry Drummond (1854–1907) – Mohill-born Canadian poet.
Seán Mac Diarmada (1883–1916) – political activist and revolutionary leader executed following the 1916 Rising.  
Thomas Heazle Parke (1857-1893) - doctor, explorer, soldier and naturalist.
Patrick Rogan (1847-1912) – US Army soldier and Medal of Honor recipient.
James Gralton (1886-1945) – Socialist activist and only Irish person ever deported from independent Ireland.
John McDonald (of Dromod) (1846-1911) – 19th-century poet and nationalist
William Lendrim (1830–1891) - Victoria Cross recipient.
John Willoughby Crawford QC (1817–1875) - Lieutenant-Governor of Ontario (1873–75).
Charles Irwin (1824–1873) - Irish recipient of the Victoria Cross
Anthony Durnford (1830-1879) - Lieutenant-Colonel in British Army, served in Anglo-Zulu War

1900s
John Joe McGirl (1921–1988) – Sinn Féin TD (1957–1961) and former Chief of Staff of the Irish Republican Army
Katherine Lynch (b. 1972) – comedian
James Kilfedder (1928–1995) Unionist Politician and MP for North Down (UK Parliament constituency) (1970–1995)
John McGahern (1934–2006) – award-winning author and novelist
Pat Quinn (1935–2009) – founder of Quinnsworth, Ireland's first supermarket chain.
Patrick McGoohan (1928-2009) – actor
Paul Williams (b.1964) – journalist
Eleanor Shanley – Singer
Gordon Wilson (1927-1995) - peace campaigner and Irish senator
 Seamus O'Rourke – award-winning actor, writer, director and producer of award-winning plays such as Victor's Dung and Padraig Pott's Guide to Walking
John Godley (1920-2006) - 3rd Baron Kilbracken
Victor Costello (b.1970) - Ireland rugby international and Olympian, was a former resident of Keshcarrigan.
Carole Coleman (b. 1966) - RTÉ broadcaster
Charlie McGettigan (1950-2019) - Singer-songwriter and Eurovision winner has been a Drumshanbo resident since 1973.
Paschal Mooney (b. 1947) - RTÉ broadcaster and former member of Seanad Éireann
Colm O'Rourke (b. 1957) – retired Gaelic footballer and currently a sports broadcaster is originally from Aughavas.
Ray O'Rourke (businessman) (b. 1947) – chairman and CEO of the construction multinational Laing O'Rourke
Declan Maxwell (b.1980/81) – former Gaelic footballer

See also
 Muintir Eolais
 Kingdom of Breifne
 Lord Lieutenant of Leitrim

References and notes

Primary references

Secondary sources

Historical

External links

 Statusireland.com Leitrim Population Chart (1841–2006)
 http://www.leitrimgaa.ie/

 
Leitrim
Leitrim
Leitrim